Jean-Paul Maho (born 20 February 1945) is a French former cyclist. He competed in the team time trial event at the 1976 Summer Olympics.

References

External links
 

1945 births
Living people
French male cyclists
Olympic cyclists of France
Cyclists at the 1976 Summer Olympics
Sportspeople from Lorient
Cyclists from Brittany
20th-century French people